The Baicu or Boicu is a left tributary of the river Iza in Romania. It discharges into the Iza near Dragomirești. Its main tributaries are the Călimaș and the Idișor.

References

Rivers of Romania
Rivers of Maramureș County